Stephen A. Ballard (September 9, 1815 – August 11, 1901) was a businessman in Brooklyn, New York and a philanthropist. He was in the leather business. He funded schools for African Americans in the southern United States including Ballard School in Macon, Georgia that was renamed for him. In addition to the school in Macon, Georgia he funded schools in Salisbury, North Carolina, Tougaloo, Mississippi, and Berea, Kentucky. He also donated money in support of students at Clark University in Atlanta. He left $50,000 to Berea College in his will.

Ballard was born in Andover, Massachusetts. He and his sister funded Andover Hall at Lewis Normal Institute. The school was renamed Ballard Normal School in his honor. He was a prominent member of the American Missionary Association (AMA).

Silas Belden Brown worked for his leather company. It was at 16 and 18 Chambers Street.

Ballard High School merged to form Ballard-Hudson High School.

Further reading
 New York Times obituary August 13, 1901

References

External links
 

1815 births
1901 deaths
People from Andover, Massachusetts
Philanthropists from Massachusetts
Businesspeople from Brooklyn
Philanthropists from New York (state)
19th-century American businesspeople
American abolitionists
American Missionary Association